Eileen Tabios (born 1960) is a Filipino-American poet, fiction writer, conceptual/visual artist, editor, anthologist, critic, and publisher.

Early life 
Born in Ilocos Sur, Philippines, Tabios moved to the United States at the age of ten. She earned a B.A. in political science from Barnard College in 1982 and an M.B.A. in economics and international business from New York University Stern School of Business. Her last corporate career was involved with international project finance.

Poetry career
Tabios began to write poetry in 1995. Tabios has released over 50 collections of poetry, fiction, essays, and experimental biographies from publishers in nine countries and cyberspace. Her books include a form-based “Selected Poems” series which focus on the prose poem, the catalog or list poem, visual poetry and tercets: The In(ter)vention of the Hay(na)ku: Selected Tercets 1996-2019, THE GREAT AMERICAN NOVEL: Selected Visual Poetry (2001-2019), INVENT(ST)ORY: Selected Catalog Poems & New 1996-2015, and THE THORN ROSARY: Selected Prose Poems & New 1998-2010. She issues “Selecteds” based on poetry form in order to show how she expanded a form's landscape.

She's also released the first book-length haybun collection, 147 MILLION ORPHANS (MMXI-MML); a collected novels, SILK EGG; an experimental autobiography AGAINST MISANTHROPY; as well as two bilingual and one trilingual editions. Her award-winning body of work includes invention of the hay(na)ku poetic form whose 15th anniversary was celebrated at the San Francisco and Saint Helena Public Libraries in 2018, as well as a first poetry book, BEYOND LIFE SENTENCES (1998), which received the Philippines’ National Book Award for Poetry. Translated into nine languages, Tabios also has edited, co-edited or conceptualized 15 anthologies of poetry, fiction and essays, as well as exhibited visual art in the United States, Asia and Serbia. Her writing and editing works have received recognition through awards, grants and residencies.

Tabios also founded the literary and arts press, Meritage Press; the poetry review journals Galatea Resurrects and The Halo-Halo Review; and the art gallery North Fork Arts Projects.

Awards
In addition to receiving the Philippines’ National Book Award for Poetry, her poetry and editing projects have also received numerous awards including the PEN Oakland/Josephine Miles Literary Award, The Potrero Nuevo Fund Prize, the Gustavus Meyers Outstanding Book Award in the Advancement of Human Rights, Foreword Magazine Anthology of the Year Award, Poet Magazine's Iva Mary Williams Poetry Award, Judds Hill's Annual Poetry Prize and the Philippine American Writers & Artists’ Catalagan Award; recognition from the Academy of American Poets, the Asian/Pacific American Librarians Association and the PEN/Open Book Committee; as well as grants from the Witter Bynner Foundation, National Endowment of the Arts, the New York State Council on the Humanities, the California Council for the Humanities, and the New York City Downtown Cultural Council.

Bibliography
Each of the following is a poetry collection unless stated otherwise
After the Egyptians Determined The Shape of the World is a Circle
Black Lightning (poetry interviews/essays)
Beyond Life Sentences
The Anchored Angel (Jose Garcia Villa), As Editor
BABAYLAN: FILIPINA WRITING, As Editor (with Nick Carbo)
Ecstatic Mutations (poems and poetics prose)
My Romance (art essays with poems)
Bridgeable Shores (Luis Cabalquinto), As Editor
The Empty Flagpole (CD)
Reproductions of the Empty Flagpole
Screaming Monkeys, As Editor (with M. Evelina Galang and others)
Gravities of Center (Barbara Jane Reyes), As Editor
Behind The Blue Canvas (short stories)
Menage A Trois With the 21st Century
The Estrus Gaze(s)
Crucial Bliss Epilogues
Songs of the Colon
Enheduanna in the 21st Century
FOOTNOTE POEMS: There, Where The Pages Would End
I TAKE THEE, ENGLISH, FOR MY BELOVED (multi-genre poetry)
Pinoy Poetics (developed by Eileen Tabios; edited by Nick Carbo)
Poems Form/From The Six Directions
POST BLING BLING
The Secret Lives of Punctuations, Vol. I
The First Hay(na)ku Anthology (developed by Eileen Tabios; edited by Mark Young & Jean Vengua)
The Hay(na)ku Anthology, Vol. 2 (developed by Eileen Tabios; edited by Mark Young & Jean Vengua)
DREDGING FOR ATLANTIS
It's Curtains
SILENCES: THE AUTOBIOGRAPHY OF LOSS
THE SINGER And Others
The Light Sang As It Left Your Eyes (multi-genre poetry)
The Blind Chatelaine's Keys (biography with haybun)
NOVEL CHATELAINE (novel)
NOTA BENE EISWEIN
THE CHAINED HAY(NA)KU PROJECT ANTHOLOGY, As Curator (with Ivy Alvarez, John Bloomberg-Rissman and Ernesto Priego)
THE THORN ROSARY: Selected Prose Poems & New 1998-2010 (Edited with an Introduction by Thomas Fink; Afterword by Joi Barrios)
SILK EGG: Collected Novels (2009-2009)
the relational elations of ORPHANED ALGEBRA (with j/j hastain)
5 Shades of Gray
THE AWAKENING: A Long Poem Triptych & A Poetics Fragment
147 MILLION ORPHANS (mmxi-mml)
44 RESURRECTIONS
SUN STIGMATA (Sculpture Poems)
I FORGOT LIGHT BURNS
AGAINST MISANTHROPY: A Life in Poetry (1995-2015)
DUENDE IN THE ALLEYS
INVENT(ST)ORY: Selected Catalog Poems and New (1996-2015)
THE CONNOISSEUR OF ALLEYS
Excavating the Filipino In Me
The Gilded Age of Kickstarters
I FORGOT ARS POETICA / AM UITAT ARTA POETICA
AMNESIA: Somebody’s Memoir
THE OPPOSITE OF CLAUSTROPHOBIA: Prime’s Anti-Autobiography
YOUR FATHER IS BALD: Selected Hay(na)ku Poems
TO BE AN EMPIRE IS TO BURN!
IMMIGRANT: Hay(na)ku & Other Poems In A New Land
Love In A Time of Belligerence
MANHATTAN: An Archaeology
MURDER DEATH RESURRECTION: A Poetry Generator
HIRAETH: Tercets From the Last Archipelago
TANKA: Vol. 1ONE TWO THREE: Selected Hay(na)ku PoemsTHE GREAT AMERICAN NOVEL: Selected Visual Poetry (2001-2019)Witness in the Convex MirrorThe In(ter)vention of the Hay(na)ku: Selected Tercets (1996-2019)PAGPAG: The Dictator’s Aftermath in the Diaspora (short stories)INCULPATORY EVIDENCE: The Covid-19 PoemsPolitical LoveLa Vie erotique de l’artDOVELION: A Fairy Tale for Our Times (novel)''

References

External links
 Interview with Eileen Tabios

1960 births
Living people
Filipino women writers
Filipino emigrants to the United States
American poets of Asian descent
American magazine editors
People from Ilocos Sur
American writers of Filipino descent
American women poets
American women journalists
Barnard College alumni
New York University Stern School of Business alumni
Women anthologists
21st-century American poets
Women magazine editors
21st-century American women writers